Maupiti Airport  is an airport on Maupiti, one of the Leeward Islands in French Polynesia.

Airlines and destinations

References

External links
 

Airports in French Polynesia